Thomas Hanmer (c. 1702–1737), of Fenns, Shropshire, was an English Tory politician who sat in the House of Commons from 1734 to 1737.

Hanmer was the eldest son of William Hanmer of Fenns, Shropshire and his wife Esther Jennens, daughter of Humphrey Jennens of Gopsall, Leicestershire. He was admitted at St Catharine's College, Cambridge on 25 April 1720 and was awarded BA in 1724.  In 1724 he succeeded to  the estates of his father. He was awarded MA at Cambridge in 1729 and was incorporated at Oxford University in 1731.  He married (with £6,000), Lady Catherine Perceval, daughter of John Perceval, 1st Earl of Egmont on 9 April 1733.  
  
At the 1734 British general election, Hanmer was returned as Member of parliament for Castle Rising on the Howard interest. He was presumably a Tory   

Hanmer was the prospective heir of Sir Thomas Hanmer, 4th Baronet, but died without issue of tuberculosis on 1 April 1737.

References

1702 births
1737 deaths
Politicians from Shropshire
Members of the Parliament of Great Britain for English constituencies
British MPs 1734–1741
Alumni of St Catharine's College, Cambridge